The following outline is provided as an overview of and topical guide to Scotland:

Scotland – The oldest monarchy in Europe, the second oldest country in Europe and is the fifth oldest country in the world, preceding France, England and Denmark. It is currently part of the United Kingdom. Occupying the northern third of the largest island, it shares a border with England to the south and is bounded by the North Sea to the east, the Atlantic Ocean to the north and west, and the North Channel and Irish Sea to the southwest. In addition to the mainland, Scotland consists of over 790 islands including the Northern Isles and the Hebrides.

General reference 
 Pronunciation: 
 Etymology of "Scotland"
 Common English country name(s): Scotland
 Official English country name(s): Scotland
 Common endonym(s): Alba
 Official endonym(s):  
 Adjectival(s): Scottish, Scots, Scotch
 Demonym(s): Scottish, Scots

Geography of Scotland 

Geography of Scotland
 Scotland is: a constituent country of the United Kingdom. See Countries of the United Kingdom.
 Population of Scotland: 5,254,800  (2011 est)
 Area of Scotland:  78 772 km2 (30,414 square miles), approximately 32% of the area of the United Kingdom (UK)
 Places in Scotland
 Atlas of Scotland

Location 
 Scotland is situated within the following regions
 Atlantic Ocean
 Northern Hemisphere, on the Prime Meridian
 Eurasia (but not on the mainland)
 Europe (outline)
 Northern Europe
 British Isles
 Great Britain (the northern third of the island)
 Several hundred other Islands of Scotland
 Extreme points of Scotland

Environment of Scotland 

Environment of Scotland
 Climate of Scotland
 Climate change in Scotland
 Ecology of Scotland
 Renewable energy in Scotland
 Geology of Scotland
 Protected areas of Scotland
 Biosphere reserves in Scotland
 National parks of Scotland
 Wildlife of Scotland
 Flora of Scotland
 Fauna of Scotland
 Birds of Scotland
 Mammals of Scotland
 Domesticated breeds

Natural geographic features of Scotland 
 Firths
 Glaciers of Scotland
 Islands of Scotland
 Hebrides
 Inner Hebrides
 Outer Hebrides
 Orkney Islands
 Shetland Islands
 Islands of the Clyde
 Islands of the Forth
 List of freshwater islands in Scotland
 Lochs
 Lochs in Scotland
 Mountains and hills of Scotland
List of Munros
 Volcanoes in Scotland
 Rivers of Scotland
 Waterfalls of Scotland
 Valleys of Scotland
 World Heritage Sites in Scotland

Regions of Scotland 
 Central Belt
 Scottish Midlands
 Scottish Highlands
 Scottish Lowlands
 Scottish Borders
 Galloway
 Northern Isles

Ecoregions of Scotland 

List of ecoregions in Scotland

Administrative divisions of Scotland 

Administrative divisions of Scotland
 Council areas of Scotland
 Civil parishes in Scotland
 Municipalities of Scotland
 Unitary authorities of Scotland

Municipalities of Scotland 

Municipalities of Scotland
 Capital of Scotland: Edinburgh (outline)
 Cities in Scotland
 Towns in Scotland

Demography of Scotland 

Demographics of Scotland

Government and politics of Scotland 

Politics of Scotland
 Form of government:
 Capital of Scotland: Edinburgh
Elections in Scotland
Electoral systems in Scotland
List of political parties in Scotland
Pressure Groups in Scotland
Scottish independence
Fiscal autonomy
National Conversation
Scotland Office (Department of UK Government)
Secretary of State for Scotland

Branches of the devolved government of Scotland 

Government of Scotland
 History of Scottish devolution

Executive 
 Head of government: First Minister of Scotland
 Scottish Government

Legislative 
Scottish Parliament
List of Acts of the Scottish Parliament from 1999

Judicial 
 Supreme Court of the United Kingdom
 Courts of Scotland
 List of courts in Scotland
 Crown Office and Procurator Fiscal Service
 Faculty of Advocates
 Lord Advocate
 Lord President of the Court of Session
 Procurator Fiscal
Solicitor General for Scotland

Law and order in Scotland 

Scots law
 Capital punishment in Scotland: There has been a history of capital punishment but it is not used now.
 Human rights in Scotland
 Freedom of religion in Scotland
 LGBT rights in Scotland
 Law enforcement in Scotland
Police Scotland
Scottish Prison Service
 Prison population of Scotland
Manrent
Marriage in Scotland
 Rights of way in Scotland
 Udal law

Military of Scotland 

Military of Scotland
 Scotland had its own military until 1707. Now merged with British Armed Forces except for the Atholl Highlanders.
 Military history of Scotland

Local government in Scotland 

Local government in Scotland

History of Scotland 

 Battles between Scotland and England
 Kingdom of Scotland
 Parliament of Scotland
 Peerage of Scotland

By period 
Timeline of Scottish history
Prehistoric Scotland
Timeline of prehistoric Scotland
Declaration of Arbroath
List of monarchs of Scotland
Kingdom of Scotland
Scotland in the High Middle Ages
Wars of Scottish Independence
Scotland in the Late Middle Ages
Scottish Reformation
Scottish colonization of the Americas
Parliament of Scotland
List of Acts of the Scottish Parliament to 1707
Treaty of Union 1707
Jacobitism
Scottish Enlightenment
Highland Clearances
Lowland Clearances

By region 
History of Angus
History of Dundee
History of Edinburgh
History of Fife
History of Glasgow
History of Orkney
History of the Outer Hebrides

By subject 

 History of education in Scotland
 History of the Jews in Scotland
 History of local government in Scotland
 History of the Scots language
 History of universities in Scotland
 Military history of Scotland

Culture of Scotland 

Culture of Scotland
 Architecture of Scotland
 Architecture of Scotland in the Prehistoric era
 Architecture of Scotland in the Roman era
 Architecture of Scotland in the Middle Ages
 Architecture in early modern Scotland
 Architecture of Scotland in the Industrial Revolution
 Architecture in modern Scotland
 Baronial architecture in Scotland
 Church architecture in Scotland
 Cathedrals in Scotland
 Castles in Scotland
 Castles in Scotland
 Hill forts in Scotland
 Historic houses in Scotland
 Housing in Scotland
 Cuisine of Scotland
Harris Tweed
Hogmanay
Scottish clan
Scotch whisky
Bean Nighe
 Tartan
Tartan Day (List of tartans)
 Ethnic minorities in Scotland
 Gardens in Scotland
 Festivals in Scotland
 Humour in Scotland
 Inventions and discoveries of Scottish origin
 Languages of Scotland
 Scottish Gaelic language
 Lowland Scots
 Scottish English
Highland English
 Marriage in Scotland
 Civil partnership in Scotland
 Media in Scotland
 Television in Scotland
 Museums in Scotland
Mythology of Scotland
 National symbols of Scotland
 Coat of arms of Scotland
 Flag of Scotland
 National anthem of Scotland
 Prostitution in Scotland
 Public holidays in Scotland
 Christmas in Scotland
 Scottish national identity
 World Heritage Sites in Scotland

Art in Scotland 

Scottish art
Celtic art
Migration Period art
National Gallery of Scotland
 Cinema of Scotland
 Comedy in Scotland
 Dance in Scotland
 Scottish country dance
Scottish highland dance
 Ghillies
Jig
 Scottish sword dances
 Dirk dance
 Literature of Scotland
 Scottish writers
Ossian
 
Music of Scotland
Bagpipes
Great Highland bagpipe
Pipe band
 Church music in Scotland
 Classical music in Scotland
 Court music in Scotland
 Folk music of Scotland
 Music of Scotland in the nineteenth century
 Opera in Scotland
Scottish country dance music
 Scottish photography
 Theatre in Scotland
 Scottish Playwrights

People of Scotland 
Scottish people
Celt
Gaels
Modern Celts
Lists of Scots
List of monarchs of Scotland
List of Queens of Scotland
Scottish monarchs family tree
List of Scottish musicians
List of Scottish novelists
List of Scottish scientists
List of Scottish writers
Scottish surnames

Religion in Scotland 
 Religion in Scotland
 Buddhism in Scotland
 Christianity in Scotland
Baptist Union of Scotland
Scottish Episcopal Church
Church of Scotland
General Assembly of the Church of Scotland
List of Moderators of the General Assembly of the Church of Scotland
 Roman Catholicism in Scotland
 Hinduism in Scotland
Judaism in Scotland
 Islam in Scotland
 History of the Jews in Scotland
 List of Scottish Jews
 Sikhism in Scotland

Sports in Scotland 
Sports in Scotland
 American football in Scotland
 Scottish Claymores
 Australian rules football in Scotland
 Basketball in Scotland
 Scotland national basketball team
 Chess in Scotland
 Scottish Chess Federation
 Commonwealth Games Council for Scotland
 Cricket in Scotland
Scottish national cricket team
 Curling
 Field Hockey in Scotland
 Scotland women's national field hockey team
Football in Scotland
Scotland national football team
Scotland women's national football team
Scottish Football Association
Scottish Professional Football League
Scottish Cup
 Scotland GAA

 Golf in Scotland
The R&A
Moray Golf Club
The Royal and Ancient Golf Club of St Andrews
 Highland Games
 Tossing the caber
 Lacrosse in Scotland
 National sports teams of Scotland
 Netball
 Scotland national netball team
 Campaign for a Scottish Olympic Team – Scotland does not compete at the Olympic Games, Scottish athletes compete as part of the Great Britain team instead. There is however a long running campaign to get a team.
 Rugby in Scotland
 Rugby league in Scotland
 Rugby union in Scotland
 Scottish Rugby Union
Scotland national rugby union team
 History of rugby union in Scotland
 Murrayfield Stadium
 List of Scottish rugby union players
 Rugby union in the Borders
 Rugby Sevens (invented in Scotland)
 Edinburgh Sevens
 Melrose Sevens
 Stadiums in Scotland
 Shinty
 Camanachd Association
 Composite rules shinty-hurling
 Women's shinty

Economy and infrastructure of Scotland 

Economy of Scotland
 Economic rank (by nominal GDP):
 Agriculture in Scotland
 Banking in Scotland
 Bank of Scotland
Royal Bank of Scotland
 Communications in Scotland
Scottish media
List of newspapers in Scotland
Television in Scotland
BBC Scotland
 Internet in Scotland
 Companies of Scotland
 Currency of the United Kingdom: Pound Sterling
 Economic history of Scotland
 Energy in Scotland
 Energy policy of Scotland
 Oil industry in Scotland
North Sea Oil
 Power stations in Scotland
Renewable energy in Scotland
Nuclear power in Scotland
 Fire services in Scotland
 Health care in Scotland
 Hospitals in Scotland
NHS Scotland
Scottish Ambulance Service
 Mining in Scotland
 Tourism in Scotland
 Transport in Scotland
 Airports in Scotland
 Ports in Scotland
 Rail transport in Scotland
 Roads in Scotland
 Water supply and sanitation in Scotland
 Wild Scotland

Education in Scotland 

Education in Scotland
General Teaching Council for Scotland
List of universities in Scotland
List of schools in Scotland
Scottish Qualifications Authority

Specific schools 
 Public schools in Scotland
 Grammar schools in Scotland
 Middle schools in Scotland
 Universities

Types of schools 
 Grammar schools in the United Kingdom
 Private school
 Preparatory school
 Gaelic medium education

Notes

See also 

 Outline of geography
 Outline of the United Kingdom
 List of international rankings

References

External links 

Scotland.org – the official online gateway to Scotland, managed by the Scottish Government
Scottish Government – official site of the Scottish Government
Scottish Parliament – official site of the Scottish Parliament
National Archives of Scotland – official site of the National Archives of Scotland
Homecoming Scotland 2009
Maps and digital collections at the National Library of Scotland
Gazetteer for Scotland – Extensive guide to the places and people of Scotland, by the Royal Scottish Geographical Society and University of Edinburgh
Scottish economic statistics 2005 (pdf) – from the Scottish Executive
Scottish Census Results On Line – official government site for Scotland's census results
Scottish Neighbourhood Statistics – Scottish Government's programme of small area statistics in Scotland
Visit Scotland – official site of Scotland's national tourist board
ScotlandsPeople – official government resource for Scottish genealogy

Scotlandpictures.net Scotland in photos

Outlines of countries
 1